A conservation reserve is a protected area set aside for conservation purposes.

Conservation reserves by country

Australia

In South Australia, a conservation reserve is a type of protected area declared under the Crown Land Management Act 2009 for parcels of 'land set aside for conservation of natural and cultural features.'

United States
In the United States the Conservation Reserve Program offers annual payments for 10-15 year contracts to participants who establish grass, shrub and tree cover on environmentally sensitive lands. It was reauthorized in the 1996 Farm Bill and the 2002 Farm Bill.

See also

Conservation movement
List of conservation topics
List of environmental issues

References

Protected areas
Types of formally designated forests